Pimpri Pathar is a village in Parner taluka in Ahmednagar district of state of Maharashtra, India.

Religion
Hinduism is the dominant religion in the region.

Economy
The agriculture industry employs the most people.

See also
 Parner taluka
 Villages in Parner taluka

References 

Villages in Parner taluka
Villages in Ahmednagar district